Austin Kirk Collie (born November 11, 1985) is a Canadian former professional gridiron football wide receiver. He was drafted by the Indianapolis Colts of the National Football League (NFL) in the fourth round (127th overall) in the 2009 NFL Draft. He played college football for the Brigham Young University Cougars. Collie also played in the NFL for the New England Patriots and in the Canadian Football League (CFL) for the BC Lions.

Early life
Collie was born in Hamilton, Ontario, Canada, to American parents Scott and Nicole Collie. Scott Collie played football at Brigham Young University (BYU) from 1979 to 1982 and played professionally in the Canadian Football League (CFL) for the Hamilton Tiger-Cats and briefly in the NFL for the San Francisco 49ers during the 1983 pre-season.

Collie starred as a wide receiver at Oak Ridge High School and garnered many awards. He was a PrepStar and SuperPrep All-American as well as being voted Northern California's Most Valuable Player. During his senior season, he recorded 60 receptions for a total of 978 yards and 18 touchdowns. In 2004, Collie became an Eagle Scout.

In December 2009, Collie's hometown newspaper, The Sacramento Bee, named him Sacramento Area's Player of the Decade (2000–2009).

College career
In 2004, Collie was named MWC Freshman of the Year. He was also named the MVP of the 2007 Las Vegas Bowl and named to the All-MWC first-team in 2008.

Collie set a series of records during his three-year career at BYU (2004, 2007–2008).

Additionally, Collie was also one of the highest rated wide receivers in college football during his junior season in which he was selected to the college football All–American team.

On January 9, 2009, Collie announced in a press conference that he would forgo his senior year and enter the 2009 NFL Draft. The Indianapolis Colts drafted him in the fourth round, 127th overall.

Professional career

Indianapolis Colts
Collie impressed Indianapolis Colts Head Coach Jim Caldwell in the preseason and was placed third on the depth chart at the wide receiver position for the 2009 season, placing ahead of Pierre Garçon for the slot receiver position. However, Garçon soon jumped Collie on the depth chart shortly thereafter. Collie finished his rookie season in the NFL among the top statistical leaders for all rookies at the wide receiver position.

Collie started his second year strong, making numerous touchdown catches and establishing himself as Peyton Manning's "go-to guy" after Dallas Clark suffered a season-ending injury. However, on November 7, 2010, Collie was involved in a collision against the Philadelphia Eagles, in which he was hit on both sides of his head by Quintin Mikell and Kurt Coleman. Collie was taken off the field on a stretcher. According to a televised ESPN update, Collie was seen sitting up and moving after several minutes working with medics. Collie suffered a concussion as a result of the collision. Coleman was penalized for unnecessary roughness for the hit on Collie, but neither player was fined, as the NFL later ruled that the contact that caused the injury was incidental as a result of Mikell's initial hit. On December 19, 2010, Collie was hit in the head by Jaguars linebacker Daryl Smith and was down for several minutes. It was his second concussion-related injury that year and ultimately ended his 2010 season. Despite the fact that no fines were assessed, the highly visible injuries to Collie have added to the debate about violent hits in football. On December 22, 2010, Collie was placed on injured reserve.

Collie played in all 16 games, making 5 starts, during the 2011 regular season, but managed to only catch one touchdown pass among his 54 receptions.

During a 2012 preseason game against the Pittsburgh Steelers, Collie suffered his third concussion of his career. During the third game of the 2012 season against the Jacksonville Jaguars, Collie suffered a ruptured patellar tendon in his right knee, causing him to miss the rest of the 2012 season.

On February 15, 2013, Collie was told he would not be re-signed by the Colts.

San Francisco 49ers
On August 2, 2013, the San Francisco 49ers signed Collie to a 1-year contract. He was released on August 31, 2013, during final roster cuts.

New England Patriots
The New England Patriots signed Collie as a free agent on October 3, 2013. He was signed for a one-year, veteran-minimum contract, which is $715,000 but prorated to $546,765. Due to Collie's previous injuries, the contract included an injury waiver, meaning the Patriots could release him if he was injured and only owe him a "split" (50%) of the contract. He was released November 5, 2013 because of a knee injury, after only 3 catches for 34 yards. He was re-signed by the Patriots on December 5, 2013 to add depth with rookie wideouts Aaron Dobson and Kenbrell Thompkins dealing with nagging injuries. He was released once more on December 27, 2013, only to be re-signed on January 2, 2014. The Patriots released Collie again after the playoffs.

BC Lions
On January 29, 2015, the BC Lions of the Canadian Football League announced they had signed Collie to a contract. In his only CFL season, Collie played in 16 games, catching 43 passes for 439 yards with 7 touchdowns. Collie also recorded a touchdown as a passer, throwing a 21-yard score to quarterback Jonathon Jennings on a trick play.

On April 8, 2016, Collie announced his retirement from professional football.

Career NFL statistics

Personal life

After retiring from professional football Collie joined Cognitive FX, a concussion treatment center.

See also
 List of NCAA major college football yearly receiving leaders

References

External links

 BC Lions bio
 NFL bio
 New England Patriots bio 
 Indianapolis Colts bio 
 BYU bio

1985 births
Living people
People from El Dorado Hills, California
Latter Day Saints from California
Sportspeople from Hamilton, Ontario
Players of Canadian football from Ontario
American football wide receivers
BYU Cougars football players
Indianapolis Colts players
San Francisco 49ers players
New England Patriots players
American players of Canadian football
Canadian football wide receivers
BC Lions players
American Mormon missionaries in Argentina
Canadian players of American football